The Killers is a 1946 American film noir starring Burt Lancaster (in his film debut), Ava Gardner, Edmond O'Brien and Sam Levene. Based in part on the 1927 short story of the same name by Ernest Hemingway, it focuses on an insurance detective's investigation into the execution by two professional killers of a former boxer who was unresistant to his own murder. Directed by Robert Siodmak, it featured an uncredited John Huston and Richard Brooks co-writing the screenplay, which was credited to Anthony Veiller. As in many films noir, it is mostly told in flashback.

Released in August 1946, The Killers was a critical success, earning four Academy Award nominations, including for Best Director and Best Film Editing.

Hemingway, who was habitually disgusted with how Hollywood distorted his thematic intentions, was an open admirer of the film.

In 2008, The Killers was selected for preservation in the United States National Film Registry by the Library of Congress as being "culturally, historically, or aesthetically significant."

Plot
Two hitmen, Max and Al, arrive in Brentwood, New Jersey, to kill Pete Lund, a former boxer known as "The Swede". After being confronted by the pair in a diner Lund's coworker, Nick Adams, warns him. Strangely, Lund makes no attempt to flee, and he is shot dead in his room.

"The Swede" is soon revealed to have really been named Ole Anderson. A life insurance investigator, Jim Reardon, is assigned to find and pay the beneficiary of the Swede's $2,500 policy. Tracking down and interviewing the dead man's friends and associates, Reardon doggedly pieces together his story. Philadelphia police Lieutenant Sam Lubinsky, a longtime friend of the Swede, is particularly helpful.

In flashback it is revealed that the Swede's boxing career was cut short by a hand injury. Rejecting Lubinsky's suggestion to join the police force, the Swede becomes mixed up with crime boss "Big Jim" Colfax, and drops his girlfriend Lilly for the more glamorous Kitty Collins. When Lubinsky catches Kitty wearing stolen jewelry, the Swede confesses to the crime and serves three years in prison.

After completing his sentence, the Swede, "Dum-Dum" Clarke, and "Blinky" Franklin are recruited for a payroll robbery in Hackensack, New Jersey, masterminded by Colfax. Complicating matters is the fact that Kitty is now with Colfax. The robbery nets the gang $254,912. When their boarding house allegedly burns down, all of the gang members but the Swede are notified of a new rendezvous place. Kitty tells the Swede that he is being double-crossed by his associates, inciting him to take all of the money at gunpoint and flee. Kitty meets with him later in Atlantic City, then disappears with the money herself.

In the present, Reardon stakes out the hotel where the Swede was killed. He witnesses Dum-Dum sneaking into the building, searching for a clue that might lead him to the loot. Reardon confronts him, but he flees before he can be arrested. Reardon subsequently receives confirmation that the safe house fire occurred hours later than it was alleged to have. With this piece of information, Reardon becomes convinced that Colfax and Kitty set the Swede up from the beginning and were responsible for his murder.

Reardon goes to visit Colfax, now a successful building contractor in Pittsburgh. When confronted Colfax claims no knowledge of Kitty's whereabouts. Reardon lies, claiming he has enough evidence to convict Kitty. A short time later Reardon receives a phone call from Kitty, who suggests they meet at a nightclub called The Green Cat. Once there they order food, and Kitty claims she convinced the Swede that the others were double-crossing him so he would take her away from Colfax. She then admits having taken the money after her meeting with the Swede in Atlantic City and agrees to offer Colfax as a fall guy to save herself, believing Reardon's revelation that he has evidence against her. While Kitty goes to the ladies' room to "powder her nose", Max and Al arrive at the nightclub and try to kill Reardon. Anticipating such a confrontation, Reardon and Lubinsky manage to slay both hitmen instead. When Reardon goes to get Kitty he discovers she has escaped through the bathroom window.

Reardon and Lubinsky depart the nightclub and head to Colfax's mansion. When they arrive they find that Dum-Dum and Colfax have mortally wounded each other in a violent shootout only moments before. Lubinsky asks Colfax, barely hanging on, why he had the Swede killed. Colfax finally admits to the contract, saying he feared other gang members would locate the Swede and realize that Colfax and Kitty had double-crossed them all and absconded with the money. Kitty, kneeling beside her husband, begs him to exonerate her in a deathbed confession, but he dies first.

Cast

Production

Development
The first 20 minutes of the film, showing the arrival of the two contract killers and the murder of "Swede" Anderson, is a close adaptation of Hemingway's 1927 short story in Scribner's Magazine. The rest of the film, showing Reardon's investigation of the murder, is wholly original.

Producer Mark Hellinger paid $36,750 for the screen rights to Hemingway's story, his first independent production. The screenplay was written by John Huston (uncredited because of his contract with Warner Bros.) and Richard Brooks. Siodmak later said Hellinger's newspaper background meant he "always insisted on each scene ending with a punchline and every character being over established with a telling remark" which the director fought against.

Casting

Reportedly, Hellinger was looking to cast two or three unknowns on the theory that the known actors of the time were already so typed that the audience would know the threats instantly which would take away some of the suspense of the story. He also later said that Lancaster was not his first pick for the part of "the Swede," but Warner Bros. would not lend out Wayne Morris for the film. Other actors considered for the part include Van Heflin, Jon Hall, Sonny Tufts, and Edmond O'Brien, who was instead cast in the role of the insurance investigator. Hellinger alleged that he tested so many potential 'Swedes' that if somebody had suggested Garbo, he would have tested her too. Lancaster was under contract to producer Hal Wallis but had not yet appeared in a film. Wallis' assistant Martin Jurow told Hellinger about the then unknown "big brawny bird" who might be suitable for the role and Hellinger set up a meeting. After his screen test, Hellinger signed a contract with Lancaster to do one film a year and cast him in the role that would make him a star.

In the role of the femme fatale, Hellinger cast Gardner, who had up to then appeared virtually unnoticed in a string of minor films under contract to MGM. Gardner had difficulty achieving the requisite histrionics necessary at the end of the film when Sam Levene memorably tells her "Don't ask a dying man to lie his soul into Hell." Director Siodmak felt she did not have the necessary technique to reach the emotional climax necessary for the scene so he chose to "bully her" into Kitty's fragile emotional state by "barking at her if she did not do the scene right, he would hit her."

Release

Critical response

When the film was first released, Bosley Crowther gave it a positive review and lauded the acting. He wrote, "With Robert Siodmak's restrained direction, a new actor, Burt Lancaster, gives a lanky and wistful imitation of a nice guy who's wooed to his ruin. And Ava Gardner is sultry and sardonic as the lady who crosses him up. Edmond O'Brien plays the shrewd investigator in the usual cool and clipped detective style, Sam Levene is very good as a policeman and Albert Dekker makes a thoroughly nasty thug. ... The tempo is slow and metronomic, which makes for less excitement than suspense."

In a review of the DVD release, Scott Tobias, while critical of the screenplay, described the drama's noir style, writing, "Lifted note-for-note from the Hemingway story, the classic opening scene of Siodmak's film sings with the high tension, sharp dialogue, and grim humor that's conspicuously absent from the rest of Anthony Veiller's mediocre screenplay. ... A lean block of muscles and little else, Burt Lancaster stars as the hapless victim, an ex-boxer who was unwittingly roped into the criminal underworld and the even more dangerous gaze of Ava Gardner, a memorably sultry and duplicitous femme fatale. ... [Siodmak] sustains a fatalistic tone with the atmospheric touches that define noir, favoring stark lighting effects that throw his post-war world into shadow."

The film was considered a great commercial and critical success and launched Lancaster and his co-star Ava Gardner to stardom.

Review aggregator website Rotten Tomatoes reports an approval rating of 100% based on 32 reviews, with a weighted average of 8.12/10.

Accolades
Wins
 Edgar Award: Edgar; from the Mystery Writers of America for Best Motion Picture, Anthony Veiller (writer), Mark Hellinger (producer), and Robert Siodmak (director); 1947.

Nominations—1947 Academy Awards
 Best Director:  Robert Siodmak.
 Best Film Editing:  Arthur Hilton.
 Best Music, Scoring of a Dramatic Picture:  Miklós Rózsa.
 Best Adapted Screenplay: Anthony Veiller.

American Film Institute Lists
 AFI's 100 Years...100 Thrills - Nominated
 AFI's 10 Top 10 - Nominated Gangster Film

Adaptations
The Killers was dramatized as a half-hour radio play on the June 5, 1949, broadcast of Screen Director's Playhouse, starring Burt Lancaster, Shelley Winters and William Conrad.

In 1956, director Andrei Tarkovsky, then a film student, created a 19-minute short based on the story which is featured on the Criterion Collection DVD release.

The film was adapted in 1964, using the same title but an updated plot. Originally intended to be broadcast as a television film, it was directed by Don Siegel, and featured Lee Marvin, Angie Dickinson, John Cassavetes, and Ronald Reagan, who, as a formidable villain, famously slaps Dickinson across the face. Siegel's film was deemed too violent for the small screen and was released theatrically, first in Europe, then years later in America.

Scenes from The Killers were used in the Carl Reiner film noir spoof Dead Men Don't Wear Plaid (1982) starring Steve Martin.

Seven screenwriter Andrew Kevin Walker has written a screenplay for a new adaptation of The Killers.

Legacy
The Killers has come to be regarded as a classic in the years since its release, and in 2008, was selected for preservation in the United States National Film Registry by the Library of Congress as being "culturally, historically, or aesthetically significant." Critic Jonathan Lethem described the film in a 2003 essay as the "Citizen Kane of [film] noir."

According to Hemingway biographer Carlos Baker, The Killers "was the first film from any of his works that Ernest could genuinely admire." Commenting on the film, Hemingway said: "It is a good picture and the only good picture ever made of a story of mine."

In July 2018, it was selected to be screened in the Venice Classics section at the 75th Venice International Film Festival.

See also
 The Killers (1956)
 The Killers (1964)
 Pulp Fiction (1994)
 List of films with a 100% rating on Rotten Tomatoes

Notes

References

Bibliography

External links

 
 
 
 
 The Killers essay by Daniel Eagan in America's Film Legacy: The Authoritative Guide to the Landmark Movies in the National Film Registry, Bloomsbury Academic, 2010 , pages 395-397 

1946 films
1946 crime drama films
1940s English-language films
American black-and-white films
American crime drama films
Edgar Award-winning works
Film noir
Films based on short fiction
Films based on works by Ernest Hemingway
Films directed by Robert Siodmak
Films scored by Miklós Rózsa
Films set in New Jersey
Films with screenplays by John Huston
United States National Film Registry films
Universal Pictures films
1940s American films